John Baptiste Calkin (16 March 1827, London – 15 April 1905, Hornsey, London) was an English composer, organist and music teacher.

Life

He was born in London on 16 March 1827, the son of James Calkin (1786–1862), composer and pianist, and Victoire. 
Reared in a musical atmosphere, he studied music under his father, and his three brothers, Joseph, James, and George, also adopted the profession.

When nineteen Calkin was appointed organist, precentor, and choirmaster of St Columba's College, Dublin, in succession to Edwin George Monk. St. Columba's College was a school mainly for the boys of the upper classes and for candidates for the ministry of the Church of Ireland; music and the Irish language were prominent features in the curriculum. From 1846 to 1853, Calkin maintained a high standard of choral music at St. Columba's, and he cultivated composition. From 1853 to 1863 he was organist and choirmaster of Woburn Chapel, London; from 1863 to 1868 organist of Camden Road Chapel; and from 1870 to 1884 organist at St. Thomas's Church, Camden Town. 

In 1883, Calkin became professor at the Guildhall School of Music under Thomas Henry Weist-Hill, and concentrated on teaching and composing. He was on the council of Trinity College, London, a member of the Philharmonic Society (1862), and a fellow of the College of Organists, incorporated in 1893. 

Calkin died at Hornsey Rise Gardens on 15 April 1905 and was buried, with his brother George, in a family grave (plot no.17965) on the western side of Highgate Cemetery.

Works
As a composer, Calkin essayed many forms, but his sacred music is best known, especially his morning and evening services in B flat, G, and D. His communion service in C is marked Op. 134, a sufficient proof of his fertility. He wrote much for the organ, including numerous transcriptions, and he scored many string arrangements, as well as original sonatas and duos. His hymn tunes, though not to be found in Hymns Ancient and Modern, are in other collections such as the Congregational Church Hymnal (1883).

Calkin's setting of "Fling out the Banner" (by Bishop G. W. Doane) had a great vogue in America and the British colonies, and was included in the Canadian Book of Common Praise (1909), edited by Sir George Martin. 
His "Agape" was composed specially for the Church Hymnary of Scotland (1871), to the words "Jesu, most loving God", and was inserted in the Church Hymnal of Ireland (1874).

His best known work is the setting from 1872 of a popular Christmas poem I Heard the Bells on Christmas Day by Henry Wadsworth Longfellow.

List of works 

Scores available at Alexander Street Press.

Partsongs 

 Breathe ye soft winds, op. 48 (available for ATTB or SATB)

Sacred Music 

 Out of the deep, op. 53
 Magnificat and Nunc Dimittis is F, op. 107
 Morning, Evening and Communion Service in D
Morning and Evening Service in G
Morning and Evening Service in B-flat
 Communion Service in C, op. 134
Responses to the Commandments in B-flat [1]
Responses to the Commandments in B-flat [2]
Responses to the Commandments in D

Hymn Tunes 

 Hymn for Easter
 Agape
 Bradfield (CM)
Calkin (6.6.8.8)
Dedication (SM)
Elim (7.6.7.6D)
 Fatherhood (DCM)
Let Music Break on This Blest Morn
 Magdalen (10.4.10.4)
Munus (7.7.7.7)
Nox Praecessit (CM)
 Panis Celestis (6.5.6.5.6.5)
Ramoth (7.7.7.7D)
 St Augustine (11.10.11.6)
St David (11.11.11.11)
 Savoy Chapel (7.6.7.6.7.6)
 Sefton (LM)
 Waltham (LM)
Winchcombe (10.10.10.10)

Organ Music 

 Andante
 Hommage à Mozart
 Marche Religieuse, op. 61
 Allegretto, op. 62
 Organ Study on Pleyel's hymn tune, op. 63
 Hommage à Haydn, op. 64
 Allegretto Religioso [op. 65?]
 Minuet and Trio [op. 66?]
 Festal March [op. 67?]
 Andante Espressivo, op. 68
 Hommage à Mendelssohn, op. 81
 Harvest Thanksgiving March, op. 85
 Two part Song without words, op. 86
 Minuetto [in B minor], op. 90
 Andante con moto, op. 101
 For Holy Communion

References

Attribution

External links
 

 Calkin’s biography including his relatives
 Hymn tunes by J. B. Calkin at Cyber Hymnal
Hymn tunes by J. B. Calkin at Hymnary
 

1827 births
1905 deaths
Burials at Highgate Cemetery
English classical composers
English classical organists
British male organists
English Romantic composers
British music educators
Musicians from London
English male classical composers
19th-century English musicians
20th-century British male musicians
19th-century British male musicians
Male classical organists
19th-century organists